The long Ganz railcar is a railcar train type formerly operated by Ferrocarriles Vascongados in the Basque Country, Spain from 1928 to 1981.

History
Due to an increase in traffic, Ferrocarriles Vascongados decided in the 1920s to electrify its main line between Bilbao and San Sebastián. Thus, the company ordered six railcars to be used for hauling passenger trains with up to seven cars. They were built by Ganz in its Budapest factory in 1928, and numbered MCD 1–6. As the six railcars were not enough to satisfy the growing demand, three identical railcars were built in 1930, numbered MCD 7–9. Unlike most railcars of the time, they were constructed in metal.

In 1941, the company decided to reengine some of the railcars. However, due to problems with their design, the first batch wasn't delivered until 1944, and the first reengined railcars entered service in 1948. The reengined railcars were those numbered MCD 3–9.

The long Ganz railcars were in regular service until the mid-1970s. However, it hasn't been restored yet and remains under storage.

See also
 Ferrocarriles Vascongados § Rolling stock

References

External links
 

Railcars of Spain
Ferrocarriles Vascongados rolling stock
Train-related introductions in 1928
Ganz Works